The 2022 Odisha Open was a BWF Super 100 tournament that took place at the Jawaharlal Nehru Indoor Stadium, Cuttack, Odisha, India from 25 to 30 January 2022. It had a total prize pool of US$75,000.

Tournament
The 2022 Odisha Open was the third tournament and the first Super 100 tournament of the 2022 BWF World Tour. It was the first edition of the Odisha Open. The tournament was organized by the Badminton Association of India with sanction from the Badminton World Federation.

Venue
This international tournament was held at the Jawaharlal Nehru Indoor Stadium in Cuttack, Odisha, India.

Point distribution 
Below is the point distribution table for each phase of the tournament based on the BWF points system for the BWF Tour Super 100 event.

Prize money 
The total prize money for this tournament was US$75,000. The distribution of the prize money was in accordance with BWF regulations.

Men's singles

Seeds 

 Parupalli Kashyap (withdrew)
 Sourabh Verma (withdrew)
 Subhankar Dey (quarter-finals)
 Ajay Jayaram (withdrew)
 Kalle Koljonen (withdrew)
 Xiaodong Sheng (second round)
 Cheam June Wei (third round)
 Ade Resky Dwicahyo (withdrew)

Finals

Top half

Section 1

Section 2

Bottom half

Section 3

Section 4

Women's singles

Seeds 

 Saina Nehwal (withdrew)
 Supanida Katethong (withdrew)
 Aarkarshi Kashyap (withdrew)
 Thet Htar Thuzar (withdrew)
 Ashmita Chaliha (semi-finals)
 Jaslyn Hooi (withdrew)
 Mugdha Agrey (withdrew)
 Disha Gupta  (second round)

Finals

Top half

Section 1

Section 2

Bottom half

Section 3

Section 4

Men's doubles

Seeds 

 Vladimir Ivanov / Ivan Sozonov  (withdrew) 
 Manu Attri / B. Sumeeth Reddy (withdrew) 
 Arjun M. R. / Dhruv Kapila (withdrew) 
 Man Wei Chong / Tee Kai Wun (withdrew)
 Krishna Prasad Garaga / Vishnuvardhan Goud Panjala (quarter-finals)
 Terry Hee / Loh Kean Hean (withdrew)
 Torjus Flåten / Vegard Rikheim (withdrew)
 Tushar Sharma / Vinay Kumar Singh (quarter-finals)

Finals

Top half

Section 1

Section 2

Bottom half

Section 3

Section 4

Women's doubles

Seeds 

 Ashwini Ponnappa / N. Sikki Reddy (withdrew)
 Benyapa Aimsaard / Nuntakarn Aimsaard (withdrew)
 K. Ashwini Bhat / Shikha Gautam (withdrew)
 Vivian Hoo / Lim Chiew Sien (withdrew)
 Gayatri Gopichand / Treesa Jolly (champions)
 Anna Cheong / Teoh Mei Xing (withdrew)
 Pranjal Prabhu Chimulkar / Akshaya Warang (withdrew)
 Sanyogita Ghorpade / Shruti Mishra (final)

Finals

Top half

Section 1

Section 2

Bottom half

Section 3

Section 4

Mixed doubles

Seeds 

 Callum Hemming / Jessica Pugh (withdrew)
 Venkat Gaurav Prasad / Juhi Dewangan (withdrew)
 Dhruv Kapila / N. Sikki Reddy (withdrew)
 Ishaan Bhatnagar / Tanisha Crasto (withdrew)
 Tarun Kona / Rutaparna Panda (withdrew)
 Raju Mohamed Rehan / Jamaludeen Anees Kowsar (second round)
 Saurabh Sharma / Prajakta Sawant (withdrew)
 Terry Hee / Tan Wei Han (withdrew)

Finals

Top half

Section 1

Section 2

Bottom half

Section 3

Section 4

References

External links
 Tournament Link

Odisha Open
Odisha Open
Odisha Open
Odisha Open
Sports competitions in Odisha